Oaks is a village in Clay County, Missouri, United States. The population was 128 at the 2020 census. It is part of the Kansas City metropolitan area.

Geography

Demographics

2010 census
As of the census of 2010, there were 129 people, 54 households, and 43 families living in the village. The racial makeup of the village was 97.7% White, 0.8% African American, 0.8% Asian, and 0.8% from two or more races. Hispanic or Latino of any race were 7.8% of the population.

There were 54 households, of which 29.6% had children under the age of 18 living with them, 72.2% were married couples living together, 7.4% had a female householder with no husband present, and 20.4% were non-families. 18.5% of all households were made up of individuals, and 11.1% had someone living alone who was 65 years of age or older. The average household size was 2.39 and the average family size was 2.67.

The median age in the village was 48.4 years. 18.6% of residents were under the age of 18; 2.4% were between the ages of 18 and 24; 23.3% were from 25 to 44; 34.8% were from 45 to 64; and 20.9% were 65 years of age or older. The gender makeup of the village was 48.8% male and 51.2% female.

2000 census
As of the census of 2000, there were 136 people, 56 households, and 45 families living in the village. The population density was 1,429.2 people per square mile (525.1/km). There were 57 housing units at an average density of 599.0 per square mile (220.1/km). The racial makeup of the village was 94.12% White, 1.47% African American, 2.21% from other races, and 2.21% from two or more races. Hispanic or Latino of any race were 2.94% of the population.

There were 56 households, out of which 30.4% had children under the age of 18 living with them, 75.0% were married couples living together, 5.4% had a female householder with no husband present, and 19.6% were non-families. 16.1% of all households were made up of individuals, and 5.4% had someone living alone who was 65 years of age or older. The average household size was 2.43 and the average family size was 2.73.

In the village, the population was spread out, with 19.9% under the age of 18, 2.9% from 18 to 24, 30.1% from 25 to 44, 29.4% from 45 to 64, and 17.6% who were 65 years of age or older. The median age was 44 years. For every 100 females, there were 81.3 males. For every 100 females age 18 and over, there were 91.2 males.

The median income for a household in the village was $72,500, and the median income for a family was $76,131. Males had a median income of $44,375 versus $45,000 for females. The per capita income for the village was $26,823. There were 2.4% of families and 2.1% of the population living below the poverty line, including no under eighteens and 20.0% of those over 64.

Education
North Kansas City School District is the area school district. It is zoned to Oakwood Manor Elementary School in Gladstone, Antioch Middle School in Gladstone, and Oak Park High School in Kansas City.

References

Villages in Clay County, Missouri
Villages in Missouri